Think Fast may refer to:

Quiz shows
Think Fast (1949 game show), an early show on the ABC network
Think Fast (1989 game show), a children's quiz show on the Nickelodeon network

Others
 "Think Fast" (The Flash), an episode of The Flash
 Think Fast, Mr. Moto, a 1936 film
 "Think Fast, Father Ted," an episode of Father Ted
 Disney Think Fast, a video game